Deceit (sometimes referred to as The Deceit) is a 1923 American silent black-and-white film. It is a conventional melodrama directed by Oscar Micheaux. Like many of Micheaux's films, Deceit casts clerics in a negative light. Although the film was shot in 1921, it was not released until 1923. It is not known whether the film currently survives, which suggests that it is a lost film.

The 1922 film The Hypocrite was shown within Deceit as a film within a film.

Cast
Evelyn Preer – Doris Rutledge / Evelyn Bently
William Fountaine – unknown role
Norman Johnstone – Alfred DuBois / Gregory Wainwright
A. B. DeComathiere – Reverend Bently
Cleo Desmond – Charlotte Chesbro
Louis De Bulger – Mr. Chesbro
Mabel Young – Mrs. Levine
Cornelius Watkins – Gregory Wainwright, as a child
Mrs. Irvin C. Miller – Mrs. Wainwright
Ira O. McGowan – Mr. Wainwright

References

External links

1923 drama films
1923 films
Silent American drama films
American silent feature films
American black-and-white films
Melodrama films
1920s American films